The Elements of Typographic Style is a book on typography and style by Canadian typographer, poet and translator Robert Bringhurst. Originally published in 1992 by Hartley & Marks Publishers, it was revised in 1996, 2001 (v2.4), 2002 (v2.5), 2004 (v3.0), 2005 (v3.1), 2008 (v3.2), and 2012 (v4.0). A history and guide to typography, it has been praised by Hermann Zapf, who said "I wish to see this book become the Typographers' Bible." Jonathan Hoefler and Tobias Frere-Jones consider it "the finest book ever written about typography," according to the FAQ section of their type foundry's website. Because of its status as a respected and frequently cited resource, typographers and designers often refer to it simply as Bringhurst.

The title alludes to The Elements of Style, the classic guide to writing by Strunk and White.

Editions 
 First edition: Hartley & Marks Publishers, 1992, 254pp,  (hardcover)
 Second edition: Hartley & Marks Publishers, 1996, 352pp,  (hardcover),  (paperback)
 Third edition: Hartley & Marks Publishers, 2005,  (hardcover),  (paperback)
 Fourth edition: Hartley & Marks Publishers, 2012,  (hardcover),  (paperback)

See also 
 Anatomy of a Typeface

References

External links 
 The Elements of Typographic Style Applied to the Web – an unaffiliated webpage applying the same principles to web typography
 A Classic Thesis style – An Homage to The Elements of Typographic Style –  LaTeX and LyX template for dissertations, books and articles inspired by Bringhurst's book

1992 non-fiction books
Design books
English-language books
Style guides
Typography